Ovarian tumors, or ovarian neoplasms, are tumors arising from the ovary. They can be benign or malignant (ovarian cancer). They consist of mainly solid tissue, while ovarian cysts contain fluid.

Histopathologic classification

Ovarian tumors are classified according to the histology of the tumor, obtained in a pathology report. Histology dictates many aspects of clinical treatment, management, and prognosis. 

The most common forms are:

Mixed tumors contain elements of more than one of the above classes of tumor histology.

History 
An 1882 article appearing in Scientific American mentions the case of a patient at University of Pennsylvania Hospital when Dr. William Goodell removed a 112 lbs tumor from a 31 year old patient, who weighted 75 lbs after removal from the tumor.

References